John William "Long John" Baldry (12 January 1941 – 21 July 2005) was an English musician and actor. In the 1960s, he was one of the first British vocalists to sing the blues in clubs and shared the stage with many British musicians including the Rolling Stones and the Beatles. Before achieving stardom, Rod Stewart and Elton John were members of bands led by Baldry. He enjoyed pop success in 1967 when "Let the Heartaches Begin" reached No. 1 in the UK, and in Australia where his duet with Kathi McDonald "You've Lost That Lovin' Feelin'" reached No. 2 in 1980.

Baldry lived in Canada from the late 1970s until his death. He continued to make records there, and do voiceover work. Two of his best-known voice roles were as Dr. Ivo Robotnik in Adventures of Sonic the Hedgehog, and as KOMPLEX in Bucky O'Hare and the Toad Wars.

Early life
John William Baldry was born at East Haddon Hall, East Haddon, Northamptonshire, which was serving as a makeshift wartime maternity ward, on 12 January 1941, the son of William James Baldry (1915–1990), a Metropolitan Police constable and his wife, Margaret Louisa (1915–1989); their usual address was recorded as 18 Frinton Road, East Ham. His early life was spent in Edgware, Middlesex where he attended Camrose Primary School until the age of 11, after which he attended Downer Grammar School (now Canons High School).

Blues bands of the 1960s

Baldry appeared quite regularly in the early 1960s in the Gyre & Gimble coffee lounge, around the corner from Charing Cross railway station, and at the Bluesville R. & B. Club, Manor House, London, also Klooks Kleek (Railway Hotel, West Hampstead). He appeared weekly for some years at Eel Pie Island on the Thames at Twickenham and also appeared at the Station Hotel in Richmond, one of the Rolling Stones' earliest venues.

In the early 1960s, he sang with Alexis Korner's Blues Incorporated, with whom he recorded the first British blues album in 1962 R&B from the Marquee. At stages, Mick Jagger, Jack Bruce and Charlie Watts were members of this band while Keith Richards and Brian Jones played on stage, although none played on the R&B at the Marquee album. When The Rolling Stones made their debut at the Marquee Club in July 1962, Baldry put together a group to support them. Later, Baldry was the announcer introducing the Stones on their U.S.-only live album Got Live If You Want It!, in 1966.

Baldry became friendly with Paul McCartney after a show at the Cavern Club in Liverpool in the early 1960s, leading to an invitation to sing on one of the Beatles 1964 TV specials Around The Beatles. In the special, Baldry performs "Got My Mojo Workin'" and a medley of songs with members of the Vernons Girls trio; in the latter, the Beatles are shown singing along in the audience.

In 1963, Baldry joined the Cyril Davies R&B All Stars with Nicky Hopkins playing piano. He took over in 1964 after the death of Cyril Davies, and the group became Long John Baldry and his Hoochie Coochie Men featuring Rod Stewart on vocals and Geoff Bradford on guitar. Stewart was recruited when Baldry heard him busking a Muddy Waters song at Twickenham Station after Stewart had been to a Baldry gig at Eel Pie Island. Long John Baldry became a regular fixture on Sunday nights at Eel Pie Island from then onwards, fronting a series of bands.

In 1965, the Hoochie Coochie Men became Steampacket with Baldry and Stewart as male vocalists, Julie Driscoll as the female vocalist and Brian Auger on Hammond organ. After Steampacket broke up in 1966, Baldry formed Bluesology featuring Reg Dwight on keyboards and Elton Dean, later of Soft Machine, as well as Caleb Quaye on guitar. Dwight, when he began to record as a solo artist, adopted the name Elton John, his first name from Elton Dean and his surname from John Baldry.

Following the departure of Elton John and Bluesology, Baldry was left without a backup band. Attending a show in the Mecca at Shaftesbury Avenue, he saw a five-piece harmony group called Chimera from Plymouth, who had recently turned professional. He approached them after their set to tell them how impressed he was by their vocal harmonies and that they would be ideal to back him on the cabaret circuit he was currently embarked on, which they did.

Solo artist
In 1967, he recorded a pop song "Let the Heartaches Begin" that went to number one in Britain, followed by a 1968 top 20 hit titled "Mexico", which was the theme of the UK Olympic team that year. "Let the Heartaches Begin" made the lower reaches of the Billboard Hot 100 in the US. Baldry was still touring, doing gigs with Bluesology, but the band refused to back his rendition of "Let the Heartaches Begin", and left the stage while he performed to a backing-tape played on a large Revox tape-recorder.

In 1971, John and Stewart each produced one side of It Ain't Easy which became Baldry's most popular album and made the top 100 of the US album chart. The album featured "Don't Try to Lay No Boogie Woogie on the King of Rock and Roll" which became his most successful song in the US. Baldry's first tour of the US was at this time. The band included Micky Waller, Ian Armitt, Pete Sears, and Sammy Mitchell. Stewart and John would again co-produce his 1972 album Everything Stops For Tea which also made the lower reaches of the US album charts. The same year, Baldry worked with ex-Procol Harum guitarist Dave Ball. The 1979 album Baldry's Out was recorded in Canada, which he released at Zolly's Forum; a nightclub in Oshawa, underneath the Oshawa Shopping Centre.

In a 1997 interview with a German television programme Baldry claimed to be the last person to see singer Marc Bolan before Bolan's death on 16 September 1977, having conducted an interview with the fellow singer for an American production company, he says, just before Bolan was killed in a car accident.

Move to Canada, later career
After time in New York City and Los Angeles in 1978, Baldry lived in Dundas, Ontario from 1980 to 1984 before settling in Vancouver, British Columbia, where he became a Canadian citizen. He toured the west coast, as well as the US Northwest. Baldry also toured the Canadian east.

In 1976, he teamed with Seattle singer Kathi McDonald who became part of the Long John Baldry Band, touring Canada and the US. In 1979 the pair recorded a version of The Righteous Brothers' "You've Lost That Lovin' Feelin", following which McDonald became part of his touring group for two decades. The song entered the US Billboard charts and was a No. 2 hit in Australia in 1980. He last recorded with the Stony Plain label. His 1997 album Right To Sing The Blues won a Juno Award in the Blues Album of the Year category in the Juno Awards of 1997.

In 2003 Baldry headlined the British Legends of Rhythm and Blues UK tour, alongside Zoot Money, Ray Dorset and Paul Williams. Baldry's final United States performance was held at Barristers Hall in Columbus, Ohio, on 19 July 2004. Baldry's final UK Tour as 'The Long John Baldry Trio' concluded with a performance on Saturday 13 November 2004 at The King's Lynn Arts Centre, King's Lynn, Norfolk, England. The trio consisted of LJB, Butch Coulter on harmonica and Dave Kelly on slide guitar.

Personal life
Baldry was openly gay during the early 1960s, at least amongst his friends and industry peers. However, he did not make a formal public acknowledgement of this until the 1970s. This was possibly because until 1967 in Britain, male homosexual conduct was still a criminal offence punishable by imprisonment.

In 1968, Elton John tried to commit suicide after relationship problems with a woman, Linda Woodrow. His lyricist Bernie Taupin and Baldry found him, and Baldry talked him out of marrying her. The song "Someone Saved My Life Tonight" from Captain Fantastic and the Brown Dirt Cowboy was about the experience. The name "Sugar Bear" in the song is a reference to Baldry. Baldry had a brief relationship with lead guitarist of the Kinks, Dave Davies.

In 1978, his then-upcoming album Baldry's Out announced his formal coming out, and he addressed sexuality problems with a cover of Canadian songwriter Barbra Amesbury's "A Thrill's a Thrill".

Health and death
During the mid-1970s, Baldry suffered from depression exacerbated by his collapsing career (particularly the failure of his 1973 album Good to Be Alive) and separation from an Austrian boyfriend who was required to leave the United Kingdom when his visitor visa expired. As a result, he developed an addiction to alcohol and painkillers.

Following an incident in which he was allegedly mugged in Amsterdam, Baldry was found barely conscious by his sister, Margaret, in their Muswell Hill home, having overdosed on Valium and alcohol in an apparent suicide attempt. Baldry was institutionalized for less than a week, reportedly stopping his dependencies cold turkey. 

By the release of his 1986 album Silent Treatment, Baldry suffered from crippling gout – which required several pairs of special shoes – as well as bronchial and sinus issues. Shortly after moving into a condominium on Vancouver's 4th Avenue in 1995, Baldry was hospitalized and underwent surgery for a bleeding stomach ulcer. He quit smoking afterwards and ceased performing in clubs that allowed smoking. During a performance in Banbury promoting his 1999 live album Live, Long John Baldry Trio, Baldry was hospitalized for another bleeding ulcer caused and obscured by his arthritis medication indometacin. A few days after being discharged from Horton General Hospital, he developed agonizing gout across his body, prompting Rod Stewart to admit him to the London Clinic, where he stayed for three weeks.

In 2002, Baldry remarked that he had developed spinal osteoporosis and dorsocervical lipodystrophy. He underwent hip replacement surgery to treat his osteoporosis, after which Tom Lavin of the Powder Blues Band noted that he appeared healthier.

Baldry died on 21 July 2005 at Vancouver General Hospital after a four-month battle with a chest infection. He was 64 years old. He was survived by his partner, Felix "Oz" Rexach, his brother, Roger, and his sister, Margaret. According to Rexach, Baldry fell ill with pneumonia after returning from a European tour earlier that year, and his infection developed antibiotic resistance.

Discography

Studio albums

Live albums

Compilations

Singles

EPs

Other recordings

Performances on other albums
 (1960) 6 Out Of 4 ~ The Thames-Side Four - Folklore (F-EP/1) Live recording of the group with LJB on guitar and vocals.
 (1962) R&B from the Marquee ~ Blues Incorporated - Decca (ACL 1130) Baldry provides lead vocals on three tracks including 'How Long, How Long Blues.'''
 (1970) The First Supergroup ~ The Steampacket - BYG Records (529.706) Recorded December 1965 the album features tracks with LJB on lead vocals (1971) The First Rhythm & Blues Festival In England ~ Various Artists - BYG Records (529.705) Recorded live in Feb 1964 Baldy sings '2.19' and 'Mojo Working (1971) Every Picture Tells A Story ~ Rod Stewart - Mercury (6338 063) LJB provides backing vocals on the title track and 'Seems Like A Long Time'.
 (1972) Mar Y Sol: The First International Puerto Rico Pop Festival ~ Various Artists - Atco Records (SD 2-705) Baldry sings a live version of the self-penned 'Bring My Baby Back To Me'.
 (1975) Dick Deadeye: Original Soundtrack ~ Various Artists - GM Records (GML 1018) Soundtrack to the animated film of the same name with LJB taking lead vocals on three tracks.
 (1975) Sumar Á Sýrlandi ~ Stuðmenn - Egg (EGG 0000 1/13) Rare Icelandic album. Baldry sings the track 'She Broke My Heart'.
 (1996) Bone, Bottle, Brass or Steel ~ Doug Cox - Malahat Mountain LJB performs 'Good Morning Blues' accompanied by Doug Cox.
 (1998) You Got The Bread... We Got The Jam! ~ Schuld & Stamer - Blue Streak Records (BSCD98001) Long John joins with acoustic blues duo Schuld & Stamer on several tracks.
 (2002) For Fans Only! ~ Genya Ravan - AHA Music Features a rare duet with Ravan and Baldry on 'Something's Got A Hold On Me'. Recorded in 1978.
 (2011) The Definitive Steampacket Recordings ~ The Steampacket - Nasty Productions Features two previously unreleased Steampacket tracks with LJB on lead vocals.
 (2013) Radio Luxembourg Sessions: 208 Rhythm Club - Vol. 5 ~ Various Artists - Vocalion (CDNJT 5319) October 1961 recording. LJB sings 'Every Day I Have The Blues' 
 (2013) Radio Luxembourg Sessions: 208 Rhythm Club - Vol. 6 ~ Various Artists - Vocalion (CDNJT 5320) October 1961 recording of LJB singing 'The Glory Of Love'.TV specials'''

(1965) Rod The Mod
(1974) The Gospel According To Long John
(1985) Long John Baldry: Rockin' The Blues
(1987) Long John Baldry At The Maintenance Shop
(1993) Long John Baldry In Concert
(1993) Leverkusen Blues Festival '93: The Long John Baldry Band
(1993) Waterfront Blues Festival: Long John Baldry
(1997) Leverkusen Blues Festival '97: Long John Baldry & Tony Ashton
(1998) Café Campus Blues with Long John Baldry
(2001) Happy Birthday Blues: Long John Baldry & Friends
(2007) Long John Baldry: In The Shadow Of The Blues

Filmography

Film

Television

Video games

Theatre

References

Citations

Bibliography

External links

 Official website replaced with archived version
 Long John Baldry Website Archive
 Musical Tree ~ JohnBaldry.com (Baldry band memberships) Archived version of page
 Profile at GTA agency recovered archived version of site
 London (Ontario) Free Press report of death published 23 July 2005
 Long John Baldry ~ VH1 profile 
 [ Long John Baldry: Biography ~ AllMusic.com]
 
 Billboard report on Baldry's death 22 July 2005
 
 Long John Baldry and The Marquee Club
 It Ain't Easy: Long John Baldry and the Birth of the British Blues (Paperback)
 Long John Baldry: In the Shadow of the Blues (documentary) 
 

1941 births
2005 deaths
20th-century British guitarists
20th-century British male singers
20th-century Canadian guitarists
21st-century Canadian guitarists
20th-century Canadian male singers
21st-century Canadian male singers
20th-century English male actors
21st-century English male actors
20th-century English male singers
21st-century English male singers
20th-century Canadian LGBT people
21st-century Canadian LGBT people
All-Stars (band) members
Audiobook narrators
Blues Incorporated members
Bluesology members
British blues singers
British rhythm and blues boom musicians
Canadian blues guitarists
Canadian gay actors
Canadian male guitarists
Canadian male voice actors
English blues guitarists
English blues singers
English buskers
English emigrants to Canada
English male guitarists
English male singers
English male voice actors
Gay singers
Infectious disease deaths in British Columbia
Juno Award for Blues Album of the Year winners
Canadian LGBT singers
English LGBT singers
Naturalized citizens of Canada
People educated at Canons High School
Steampacket members
Stony Plain Records artists